Holy Name Church Rectory, Convent and School is a historic church at 2920 and 2914 S. 3rd Street and 2911 and 2921 S. 4th Street in Louisville, Kentucky.

It was built in 1902 and added to the National Register in 1982. However, in 2022 - despite having been added to the National Register, which protects historic buildings - the Archdiocese of Louisville took legal measures that allowed Catholic Charities to demolish the school building to make a parking lot. The Convent is also due for demolition, though plans for it's footprint have yet to be determined. (A local Louisville architectural firm offered to purchase and restore the buildings, which had been illegally neglected by Catholic Charities, but the Archdiocese of Louisville convinced the Court a private parking lot would better serve the community, even though the community advocated for restoration.)

References

Convents in the United States
Churches on the National Register of Historic Places in Kentucky
Neoclassical architecture in Kentucky
Gothic Revival church buildings in Kentucky
Roman Catholic churches completed in 1902
Roman Catholic churches in Louisville, Kentucky
National Register of Historic Places in Louisville, Kentucky
20th-century Roman Catholic church buildings in the United States
Neoclassical church buildings in the United States
Clergy houses in the United States
1902 establishments in Kentucky

There is no such thing as Holy Name Convent parishioners. Please read that line in the attached link as Archdiocese employees.https://casetext.com/case/ramser-v-catholic-charities-of-louisville-inc/